]
Gore Bay became a town on April 7, 1890, on Manitoulin Island in Ontario, Canada. Located on Gore Bay, a bay of Lake Huron's North Channel, it is one of the two incorporated towns of Manitoulin District, of which it is the administrative and government seat. After the Treaty of 1862, Manitoulin Island was open for white settlement. Small towns began to emerge from the wilderness, and hotels were developed to provide lodgings for prospective land purchasers. This led to the formation of the town Gore Bay. The town's name is believed to be referencing the gore-shaped harbour. Other theories for the namesake are probably for Sir Francis Gore (1769-1852), Lieutenant-Governor of Upper Canada from 1806-1817, or after the steamer Gore (c. 1839 and scrapped 1861), which ran between Sault Ste. Marie and Collingwood from 1860 to 1870.

Boats were regularly travelling from Sault Ste. Marie, Collingwood, and Owen Sound; establishing regular ports of call on Manitoulin Island, specifically Gore Bay, and prospering hotels due to increased traffic. The new hotel industry in Gore Bay welcomed commercial travellers, fishermen, doctors, lumbermen and tourists.

Three hotels served Gore Bay for many years:

 The Atlantic Hotel
 The Campbell House, located on the harbour
 The Ocean House and Pacific Hotel

Community life in Gore Bay has always been closely connected to water, in fact before roads were built water was the only means available for travellers to get to the port of Gore Bay by boat. Boats would arrive and leave town with goods until the late 1950's, meaning the population was also quite low in the town's early years.

Notable people 
Ken Mackenzie. former baseball player for the New York Mets
 National Hockey League player Bobby Burns.

Demographics 

Industrial development 

 Craft brewer Split Rail Brewing is located in Gore Bay.
 Manitoulin Transport, one of Canada's largest trucking companies. 
The first Gore Bay Highschool (which went up to grade 13, which wasn't common in Manitoulin district) now houses the Manitoulin Lodge Nursing home, and the only nursing home is located in Gore Bay. There is no longer any high school in Gore Bay; students get bussed to surrounding communities like M'Chigeeng First Nation/West Bay. 
The Pacific Hotel, also known as the "red onion" had a very popular bar where a shot of whiskey could be had for 5 cents

Tourist attractions 

 Gore Bay Museum - What now houses the Gore Bay Museum used to be the courthouse, a land office and a home for the jailer—with jail cells erected from 1889 when Gore Bay became the judicial seat of Manitoulin Island.
 East Bluff Lookout
The Queens Hotel/Inn 
All Saints Anglican Church - oldest building in Gore Bay after the town went into flames in 1908.

Climate

Gore Bay experiences a humid continental climate (Dfb).

Transportation

The amount of water surrounding Manitoulin district rules three main ways of accessing Gore Bay’s township.

 Highway 540A and Highway 540B are the main roads in the township.
 Gore Bay-Manitoulin Airport is located in the town and one of two airports on Manitoulin Island. The airport is a general aviation facility.
 Ferry service aboard the Chi-Chi Maun from Tobermory in Southern Ontario is available from late May through October.

See also
List of townships in Ontario

References

External links

Municipalities in Manitoulin District
Single-tier municipalities in Ontario
Towns in Ontario
Populated places in Manitoulin Island